Sart is a name for the settled inhabitants of Central Asia which has had shifting meanings over the centuries.

Origin 
There are several theories about the origin of the term. It may be derived from the Sanskrit sārthavāha (सार्थवाह), meaning "merchant, trader, caravan leader", a term supposedly used by nomads to describe town-dwellers, according to Vasily Bartold, Gerard Clauson, and most recently Richard Foltz.

The earliest known use of the term is in the 1070 Turkic text Kutadgu Bilig "Blessed Knowledge", in which it refers to the settled population of Kashgar. Then, the term apparently referred to all settled Muslims of Central Asia, regardless of language.

Rashid al-Din Hamadani in the Jami' al-tawarikh writes that Genghis Khan commanded for Arslan Khan, prince of the Karluks, to be given the title "Sartaqtai", which he considered to be synonymous with Tajik.

A 13th-century Mongolian source, The Secret History of the Mongols, states that the Mongols called people from Central Asia, most notably Khwarazm, "Sartuul". In Mongolian, "Sar" (сар / ᠰᠠᠷᠠ) means "moon," so sart or sarta would mean "ones with (flag with) moon" since the Muslims had a crescent moon symbol on their flags. One of the Mongol tribes living in Zavkhan Province, Mongolia is made up of descendants of merchants from Khwarazm who resided in Kharkhorin and is still called Sartuul.

Alternative meanings 

In the post-Mongol period we find that Ali-Shir Nava'i refers to the Iranian people as Sart Ulusi ("Sart people"), and for him Sart tili ("Sart language") was a synonym for the Persian language. Similarly, when Babur refers to the people of Margilan as "Sarts", it is in distinction to the people of Andijan who are Turks, and it is clear that by this he means Persian-speakers. He also refers to the population of the towns and villages of the vilayat of Kabul as "Sarts".

Similarly, Babur wrote in the Baburnama in 1525, "In the country of Kābul there are many and various tribes. Its valleys and plains are inhabited by Tūrks, Aimāks, and Arabs. In the city and the greater part of the villages, the population consists of Tajiks (Sarts)."

A further change of use seems to have occurred with the arrival in the oasis regions of Turkestan of the Taza Özbek Pure Özbeks under Muhammad Shaybani. They distinguished between themselves as semi-nomadic speakers of a Fergana Kipchak language and the settled Turkic-speaking populations already living in the oasis towns, most of whom spoke the Chagatai language, one of the Karluk languages. It is at this date that the distinction between the terms Sart and Tajik seems to have made itself felt, as previously they were often used interchangeably. Even after the Uzbeks switched to a settled way of life, they continued to maintain this distinction between Turkic-speakers who were members of one of the Uzbek tribes, and Sarts, who were not.

In June 2010, "Sart" was used in ethnic conflict between Kyrgyzes and Uzbeks in southern Kyrgyzstan to distinguish the less East-Asiatic Uzbeks from Kyrgyzes.

Development of ethnic identity in Central Asia

Throughout the Qing dynasty, the sedentary Turkic inhabitants of the oases around the Tarim speaking Qarluq-Chagatay varieties were still largely known as Taranchi, Sart, under Mongol rulers of Khojan or Chagatay lineages. Other parts of the Islamic World still knew this area as Moghulistan or as the eastern part of Turkestan, and the Qing generally lumped all of its Muslim subjects under the category of "Hui people" without distinguishing between the Mandarin-speaking Dungans and ethnic groups speaking other languages such as the Taranchi, Sarts, Salars, Monguors, Bonans, etc. This is akin to the practice by Russians lumping all Muslims connected to Ottoman or Muslim Chinggisid spheres as Tatars.

In 1911, the Nationalist Chinese under the leadership of Sun Yat-sen overthrew Qing Dynasty rule and established the Republic of China.

By 1920, Jadidist Pan-Turkism challenged the Qing and Republican Chinese warlords controlling Xinjiang. Turpan poet Abdulxaliq, having spent his early years in Semey and the Jadid intellectual centres in Uzbekistan, returned to Xinjiang with a pen name that he later styled as a surname: Uyghur. He adopted the name Uyghur from the Soviets, who gave that name to his ethnic group in 1921 at Tashkent. He wrote the famous nationalist poem "Oyghan", which opened with the line "Ey pekir Uyghur, oyghan!" (Hey poor Uyghur, wake up!). He was later executed by the Chinese warlord Sheng Shicai in Turpan in March 1933 for inciting Uyghur nationalist sentiments through his works.

Modern meanings 

Vasily Bartold argues that by the 19th century those described as "Sarts" had become much more Turkicised than had previously been the case. In the literature of Imperial Russia in the 19th century the term was sometimes used to denote the Turkic-speaking peoples of Ferghana, Tashkent, Chimkent and the Southern Syr Darya Province, (also found in smaller numbers in Samarkand and Bukhara). "Sart" was also commonly employed by the Russians as a general term for all the settled natives of Turkestan. There was a great deal of debate over what this actually meant, and where the name came from. Barthold writes that "To the kazakh every member of a settled community was a Sart whether his language was Turkic or Iranian". Nikolai Ostroumov was firm in his conviction that it was not an ethnic definition but an occupational one, and he backed this up by quoting some (apparently common) local sayings: "A bad Kyrgyz becomes a Sart, whilst a bad Sart becomes a Kyrgyz". This confusion reached its peak in the 1897 Russian Empire Census: the Ferghana Province was held to have a very large Sart population, the neighbouring Samarkand Province very few but a great many Uzbeks. The distinction between the two was often far from clear. Although historically speaking the Sarts belonged to older settled groups, whereas the Uzbeks were descended from tribes which arrived in the region with Shaibani Khan in the 16th century. It seems that, in Khorezm at least, Uzbeks spoke a now-extinct Kipchak dialect closer to Kazakh, while Sarts spoke a form of Persianised Oghuz Turkic. In Fergana, the Sarts spoke a Karluk dialect that was very close to modern Uyghur and is believed to be the earlier, historical form of modern Uzbek. In 1924 the Soviet regime decreed that henceforth all settled Turkic-speaking peoples in Central Asia (and many others who spoke Persian such as in Samarkand and Bukhara areas) would be known as "Uzbeks", and that the term "Sart" was to be abolished as an insulting legacy of colonial rule., despite the fact that Lenin himself used the term in his communiques.  For the first few years, however, the language chosen by the Soviet authorities for the new Uzbek SSR was not the modern Uzbek that is found today, but the nomadic, less Persianized and quite exotic dialect of the city of Turkistan in modern Kazakhstan."The Uighurs are the people whom old Russian travellers called Sart (a name which they used for sedentary, Turkic-speaking Central Asians in general), while Western travellers called them Turki, in recognition of their language. The Chinese used to call them Ch'an-t'ou ('Turbaned Heads') but this term has been dropped, being considered derogatory, and the Chinese, using their own pronunciation, now called them Weiwuerh. As a matter of fact there was for centuries no 'national' name for them; people identified themselves with the oasis they came from, like Kashgar or Turfan." This dialect proved itself to be largely incomprehensible to most inhabitants of the primary cities, from Tashkent to Bukhara. It was therefore replaced by the modern, fundamentally Persianized "urban Uzbek" which is consequently the only Turkic language in the world without any vowel harmony.

It is thus very difficult to attach a single ethnic or even linguistic meaning to the term "Sart". Historically the various Turkic and Persian peoples of Central Asia were identified mostly by their lifestyle, rather than by any notional ethnic or even linguistic difference. The Kazakhs, Kyrgyz, and Turkmens were nomads, herding across steppes, mountains and sand deserts, respectively. The settled Turks and Tajiks, on the other hand, were Sarts, as they either lived in cities such as Khiva, Bukhara or Samarkand, or they lived in rural agricultural communities.

Use by the Dongxiang 

The Muslim, Mongol-speaking Dongxiangs of Northwest China call themselves Sarta or Santa. It is not clear if there is any connection between this term and the Sarts of Central Asia.

Use in Siberia 
Sart was one of the names applied to the Siberian Bukharans who settled in Siberia in the 17th century.

Footnotes

References 
 Owen Lattimore. (1973) "Return to China's Northern Frontier." The Geographical Journal, Vol. 139, No. 2 (Jun., 1973), pp. 233–242.

External links 

 
 

Turkic peoples of Asia
Ethnic Tajik people
Uzbeks